Jérémy Roy (born 22 June 1983) is a French former professional road bicycle racer, who competed as a professional between 2003 and 2018, spending his entire career with the  team through its various team guises. He was named the most aggressive rider of the 2011 Tour de France after escaping into breakaways on many stages and continuously attacking from inside the breakaway.

Biography
During his early career, he continued his studies at the French National Institute of Applied Sciences in Rennes, and graduated in 2007 in mechanical and automated engineering. Despite splitting his time between studying and cycling, Roy still finished 4th in the Tour de Picardie and won the young rider competition in 2006. Also in 2006, he finished 4th in the Châteauroux Classic de l'Indre, then 4th in the Grand Prix de Plumelec Morbihan in 2007 and 5th in the Route du Sud in 2008.

Roy gained his first professional victory on 12 March 2009, when he won stage 5 of Paris–Nice, beating his breakaway companion Thomas Voeckler in a sprint. The following year he won the Tro Bro Leon, performed well in the La Flèche Wallonne and finished third in the prologue of the Tour de Romandie.

He won his first race of 2011, the Grand Prix La Marseillaise Open in late January. He began the 2011 Tour de France by attacking on the 1st stage, and again on stage 4, winning the award for most combative rider for that stage. Roy came agonisingly close to winning stage 13, finishing third after being caught with 2.5 km to go, by Thor Hushovd and David Moncoutié, after a challenging pursuit in the final kilometres. He did, however, gain enough points to take the lead in the classification for the Polka Dot Jersey, and the combativity award once more. He also got in a break on the final stage and spent over 700 km of the race in breakaways.

Major results

2001
 5th Road race, UCI Junior Road World Championships
2002
 4th Paris–Mantes-en-Yvelines
2003
 2nd  Road race, UEC European Under-23 Road Championships
2005
 6th Tour du Doubs
 6th Route Adélie
 9th Tour de Vendée
 10th Grand Prix d'Ouverture La Marseillaise
2006
 4th Overall Tour de Picardie
1st  Young rider classification
 4th Châteauroux Classic
2007
 4th Grand Prix de Plumelec-Morbihan
 8th Cholet-Pays de Loire
 9th Tour du Doubs
2008
 5th Overall Route du Sud
 7th Duo Normand (with Yoann Le Boulanger)
2009
 1st Stage 5 Paris–Nice
2010
 1st Tro-Bro Léon
 2nd Duo Normand (with Anthony Roux)
 8th Chrono des Herbiers
 10th Tour du Finistère
2011
 1st Grand Prix d'Ouverture La Marseillaise
 2nd Duo Normand (with Anthony Roux)
 Tour de France
Held  Stage 13
 Combativity award Stages 4, 13 & Overall
2012
 2nd Time trial, National Road Championships
 2nd Overall Tour du Limousin
1st Stage 4
 2nd Overall Tour du Poitou-Charentes
 4th Chrono des Nations
 9th Overall Bayern–Rundfahrt
2013
 1st  Mountains classification Critérium International
 2nd Time trial, National Road Championships
 4th Overall Étoile de Bessèges
 4th Overall Bayern–Rundfahrt
 8th Chrono des Nations
2014
 2nd Chrono des Nations
 5th Overall Tour du Poitou-Charentes
 6th Overall Étoile de Bessèges
2016
 7th Chrono des Nations
 8th Overall Tour du Poitou Charentes
  Combativity award Stage 14 Tour de France
2017
 7th Chrono des Nations
2018
 3rd Duo Normand (with Bruno Armirail)
 7th Chrono des Nations

Grand Tour general classification results timeline

References

External links

Jérémy Roy's profile at Cyclingbase

1983 births
Living people
French male cyclists
Sportspeople from Tours, France
Cyclists from Centre-Val de Loire